The 2005 Major League Baseball season was notable for the league's new steroid policy in the wake of the BALCO scandal, which enforced harsher penalties than ever before for steroid use in Major League Baseball. Several players, including veteran Rafael Palmeiro, were suspended under the new policy. Besides steroids it was also notable that every team in the NL East finished the season with at least 81 wins (at least half of the 162 games played). Additionally it was the first season featuring a baseball team in Washington, D.C. since the second iteration of the Washington Senators last played there in 1971; the Washington Nationals had moved from Montreal, the first relocation of a team in 34 years and currently the last time this has occurred in the majors.

The Anaheim Angels changed their name to the Los Angeles Angels of Anaheim.

The season ended when the Chicago White Sox defeated the Houston Astros in a four-game sweep in the World Series, winning their first championship since 1917.

As of the 2022 season, this is the last season in which no no-hit games were pitched; 2005 was also only the 6th year since 1949 in which no such games were thrown.

Standings

American League

National League

Postseason

Bracket

Note: Two teams in the same division could not meet in the division series.

Statistical leaders

Batting

Team

Individual

Pitching

Team

Individual

Managers

American League

National League

±hosted the MLB All Star Game

Awards and honors

Other awards
Comeback Players of the Year: Jason Giambi (Designated hitter/first baseman, NYY, American); Ken Griffey Jr. (Center fielder, CIN, National).
Edgar Martínez Award (Best designated hitter): David Ortiz (BOS)
Hank Aaron Award: David Ortiz (BOS, American); Andruw Jones (ATL, National).
Roberto Clemente Award (Humanitarian): John Smoltz (ATL).
Rolaids Relief Man Award: Mariano Rivera (NYY, American); Chad Cordero (WSH, National).
Delivery Man of the Year (Best Reliever): Mariano Rivera (NYY).
Warren Spahn Award (Best left-handed pitcher): Dontrelle Willis (FLA)

Player of the Month

Pitcher of the Month

Rookie of the Month

Home Field Attendance & Payroll

Events
•   April 29 - The highly anticipated matchup of Roger Clemens of the Houston Astros vs. Greg Maddux of the Chicago Cubs took place at Minute Maid Park, two of the most acclaimed pitchers of the modern era (between them are 11 Cy Young awards - 7 and 4 respectively).  Both Clemens and Maddux had 300 career wins at this point in their careers, a feat that is arguably impossible for modern era pitchers to achieve since the advent of middle and closing relief rosters.  The Cubs went on to win the game 3-2.

 June 18 – Derek Jeter of the New York Yankees hits the first grand slam of his 11-year major league career, as the Yankees defeat the Chicago Cubs 8-1.

See also
2005 Nippon Professional Baseball season

Notes
Major League Baseball seasons since 1901 without a no-hitter pitched are 1909, 1913, 1921, 1927–1928, 1932–1933, 1936, 1939, 1942–1943, 1949, 1959, 1982, 1985, 1989, 2000 and 2005.

References

External links
 2005 Major League Baseball season schedule at Baseball Reference

 
Major League Baseball seasons